Radhakrishna Lutchmana "Roy" Padayachie (1 May 1950 – 5 May 2012) was the Minister of Public Service and Administration of the Republic of South Africa.

He died in the early hours of 5 May 2012 in an Ethiopian hotel room, while on an official visit to that country.

He joined the African National Congress (ANC) in 1972 and served as Executive Member of the Natal Indian Congress. He also served in the economics desk of the ANC in KwaZulu-Natal and as deputy head of local government portfolio and also a consultant to UNICEF, UNESCO and the World Bank.

Radhakrishna obtained a Bachelor of Science degree from the University of Durban-Westville, Master of Science degree from the University of London and second year readings in law from the University of South Africa.

References

External links
 Minister of Communications of the Republic of South Africa
 Radhakrishna Padayachi -  From South Africa to an Indian village
 Radhakrishna (Roy) Padayachie at Who's Who Southern Africa

1950 births
2012 deaths
Alumni of the University of London
South African people of Tamil descent
African National Congress politicians
South African people of Mauritian descent
University of Durban-Westville alumni
South African politicians of Indian descent
Communications ministers of South Africa
Members of the National Assembly of South Africa